Will You Look at Me (lit.'When I Look At You') is a 2022 Chinese short film directed by Shuli Huang. The twenty minute documentary explores the director's identity through his relationship with his mother. The short premiered at the 2022 Semaine de la Critique at Cannes Film Festival, where it won the Queer Palm Award, and has been presented in a number of festivals, including Melbourne International Film Festival and Hong Kong International Film Festival.

Plot 
As he returns to his hometown, a young Chinese filmmaker searches for himself by talking to his mother, and finally having a long due conversation that will dive them together into a quest for acceptance and love.

Reception 
Since its premiere, the film has been selected in various festivals and academies around the world:

References

External links 
 Official trailer on Youtube.
Will You Look at Me on IMDb. 

2022 films
2022 short films
Chinese animated short films
2022 LGBT-related films
LGBT-related short films
Films about anti-LGBT sentiment
Gay-related films
Chinese LGBT-related films